Mirko (Imre) Bröder, or Broeder, Broder, Breder (1911–1943) was a Hungarian–born Yugoslav chess master.

Born in Budapest, he grew up in Novi Sad, Voivodina (then Kingdom of Serbs, Croats, and Slovenes), where he studied law. 
He won a simultaneous game against Alexander Alekhine at Novi Sad 1930, took 2nd in 1930, 4th in 1931, and 2nd in 1933, all in Novi Sad (local tournaments),
tied for 4-5th at Novi Sad 1936 (the 2nd Yugoslav Chess Championship, Vasja Pirc won), and tied for 9-10th at Ljubljana 1938 (the 4th YUG-ch, Boris Kostić won).

Bröder played for Yugoslavia in 3rd unofficial Chess Olympiad at Munich 1936 on eighth board (+7 –2 =8), and in the 7th Chess Olympiad at Stockholm 1937 on first reserve board (+4 –2 =7).

During World War II, he died at the hands of the Nazis in 1943.

References

External links

1911 births
1943 deaths
Hungarian chess players
Serbian chess players
Jewish chess players
Chess Olympiad competitors
Hungarian Jews
Serbian Jews
Sportspeople from Novi Sad
20th-century chess players
Hungarian Jews who died in the Holocaust
Serbian Jews who died in the Holocaust
Hungarian civilians killed in World War II
Serbian civilians killed in World War II
Hungarian emigrants to Yugoslavia